Hussam Al Sayed (born 2 February 1972) is a Syrian football coach and former player who played as a defender.

International career
Al Sayed was a part of the Syria U20 team at the 1991 FIFA World Youth Championship in Portugal.

Personal life
Al Sayed's younger brother, Maher, also played football.

Managerial statistics

Honours

Manager
Syria
 WAFF Championship: 2012

Iraq military (Al-Quwa Al-Jawiya)
 World Military Cup: 2013

Al-Quwa Al-Jawiya
 AFC Cup: 2017

Individual
 Iraqi Premier League Best Manager of the Season: 2015–16

References

External links
 

1972 births
Living people
Sportspeople from Damascus
Syrian footballers
Association football midfielders
Al-Wahda SC (Syria) managers
Al-Yarmouk SC (Kuwait) players
Al Safa FC players
Al-Jaish Damascus players
Syrian Premier League players
Kuwait Premier League players
Syria youth international footballers
Syria international footballers
Syrian football managers
Al-Shorta Damascus managers
Syria national football team managers
Al-Quwa Al-Jawiya managers
Al-Mina'a SC managers
Dhofar Club managers
Al-Arabi SC (Kuwait) managers
Kuwait SC managers
Al-Faisaly SC managers
Syrian Premier League managers
Iraqi Premier League managers
Oman Professional League managers
Kuwait Premier League managers
Jordanian Pro League managers
AFC Cup winning managers
Syrian expatriate footballers
Syrian expatriate football managers
Syrian expatriate sportspeople in Kuwait
Syrian expatriate sportspeople in Saudi Arabia
Syrian expatriate sportspeople in Iraq
Syrian expatriate sportspeople in Oman
Syrian expatriate sportspeople in Jordan
Expatriate footballers in Kuwait
Expatriate footballers in Saudi Arabia
Expatriate football managers in Iraq
Expatriate football managers in Oman
Expatriate football managers in Kuwait
Expatriate football managers in Jordan